Acanthurus maculiceps is a tang from the Indo-West Pacific. It is known commonly as the white-freckled surgeonfish It occasionally makes its way into the aquarium trade. It grows to a size of 40 cm in length.

References

Acanthurus
Fish of Palau
Fish described in 1923